Stuart Bennett may refer to:
 Stuart Bennett (footballer)
 Stuart Bennett (bowls)
 Wade Barrett (born Stuart Alexander Bennett), professional wrestling commentator and former professional wrestler